

2009

See also
 2009 in Australia
 2009 in Australian television
 List of 2009 box office number-one films in Australia

2009
Lists of 2009 films by country or language
Films